The 2016 Guangzhou International Women's Open was a women's tennis tournament played on outdoor hard courts. It was the 13th edition of the Guangzhou International Women's Open, and part of the WTA International tournaments of the 2016 WTA Tour. It took place in Guangzhou, China, from September 19 through September 24, 2016.

Points and prize money

Prize money

1 Qualifiers prize money is also the Round of 32 prize money
* per team

Singles main-draw entrants

Seeds

 1 Rankings are as of September 12, 2016.

Other entrants
The following players received wildcards into the singles main draw:
  Peng Shuai
  Wang Yafan 
  Xu Shilin

The following players received entry from the qualifying draw:
  Lyudmyla Kichenok 
  Junri Namigata 
  Anastasia Pivovarova 
  Sofia Shapatava 
  Xun Fangying
  You Xiaodi

The following players received entry as a lucky loser:
  Cristiana Ferrando
  Ng Kwan-yau

Withdrawals
Before the tournament
  Alizé Cornet → replaced by  Jennifer Brady
  Irina Falconi → replaced by  Olga Govortsova
  Caroline Garcia → replaced by  Tatjana Maria
  Polona Hercog → replaced by  Rebecca Peterson
  Hsieh Su-wei → replaced by  Ng Kwan-yau
  Christina McHale → replaced by  Cristiana Ferrando
  Roberta Vinci → replaced by  Elizaveta Kulichkova
  Zhang Kailin → replaced by  Han Xinyun

Doubles main-draw entrants

Seeds

 1 Rankings are as of September 12, 2016.

The following pairs received wildcards into the doubles main draw:
  Olga Govortsova /  Vera Lapko
  Ng Kwan-yau /  Zheng Saisai

Champions

Singles

 Lesia Tsurenko def.  Jelena Janković, 6–4, 3–6, 6–4

Doubles

 Asia Muhammad /  Peng Shuai def.  Olga Govortsova /  Vera Lapko, 6–2, 7–6(7–3)

References

External links
 Official website

Guangzhou International Women's Open
Guangzhou International Women's Open
Guangzhou International Women's Open